Dmytro Serhiyovych Myronenko (born 7 March 1996) is a Ukrainian professional footballer who plays as a midfielder for FC Chernihiv in the Ukrainian Second League.

Player career
Myronenko started his career at amateur club Yunist Chernihiv in 2013, jumping around to several other amateur clubs over the next two years. In 2015 he moved to FC Chernihiv's youth side, with whom he played 15 matches and scored one goal. In 2017 he moved to Chernihiv's senior side, where he won the Chernihiv Oblast Football Championship in 2018 and 2019. In 2020 he made his senior debut in the 2020–21 Ukrainian Second League against Rubikon Kyiv.
On 14 April 2021 he scored a goal by free kick against FC Volyn-2 Lutsk. On 18 August he played in the 2021–22 Ukrainian Cup against Chaika Petropavlivska Borshchahivka. On 13 November he scored against Rubikon Kyiv in the 2021–22 Ukrainian Second League at the Chernihiv Arena.

On 17 September 2022, he scored against Metalurh Zaporizhzhia at the Slavutych-Arena in Zaporizhzhia becoming the first player in the history of the club to score in the Ukrainian First League.

Career statistics

Club

Honours
FC Chernihiv
 Chernihiv Oblast Football Championship: 2018, 2019

References

External links
 Dmytro Myronenko at FC Chernihiv 
 
 

1996 births
Living people
Footballers from Chernihiv
Association football defenders
FC Yunist Chernihiv players
FC Chernihiv players
FC Avanhard Koriukivka players
Ukrainian footballers
Ukrainian Second League players
Ukrainian First League players